Martin Riggs is a fictional character from the Lethal Weapon film series created by Shane Black. Riggs was originally played by actor Mel Gibson in all four films from 1987 to 1998, and later by Clayne Crawford in the Fox television series from 2016 to 2018.

Originally a member of the Los Angeles Police Department's Narcotics Division, upon being reassigned to the Homicide Division, Riggs is partnered up with straight-laced sergeant Roger Murtaugh. Riggs and Murtaugh remain partners and best friends throughout the film series.

Career

Military career 
Martin Riggs joined the U.S. Army at age 19, eventually becoming a member of the U.S. Army Special Forces, receiving specialized training in weaponry and hand-to-hand combat. These skills would later serve him well when he became a police officer. Most of Riggs' time in special forces was in Vietnam, where he served as an assassin under the CIA's "Phoenix Project". The first time he killed is never mentioned, but he mentions he shot a man with a sniper rifle from a long distance (1000 yards) in Laos; while his ability as a trained killer would later affect his mental health, he thought of it as "the only thing I was ever really good at".

Family 
In 1984, Riggs' wife, Victoria Lynn, dies in a car accident, sending him into a deep depression. Driven by grief to the brink of suicide, Riggs regularly puts himself (and anyone else near him) in danger, hoping someone will kill him. This total disregard for his own life makes him completely fearless, turning him into a "Lethal Weapon". By the end of the first film, however, he has vowed to move on with his life. In the second film, it is revealed that Victoria was actually murdered during an attempt on Riggs's life.

In the films 
In Lethal Weapon, Riggs is transferred from the narcotics division to the homicide division after a shooting incident. He is partnered with Detective Sergeant Roger Murtaugh in hopes that the older, more mature veteran will keep him in line. After a rough start, the two become best friends throughout the film series, even though Riggs always gets on Murtaugh's nerves. By the end of the first film, the two have worked together to rescue Murtaugh's daughter, who had been kidnapped by drug lords and mercenaries.

In Lethal Weapon 2, Riggs discovers that South African crime lord Arjen Rudd, whom he and Murtaugh are pursuing, ordered Riggs' death in 1984. Rudd's enforcer, Pieter Vorstedt, killed Victoria Riggs by mistake and made the murder look like an automobile accident to cover up their involvement. After avenging the deaths of his wife and Rika van den Haas (whom Riggs had become involved with romantically before she, too, was murdered by Rudd and his minions), he is able to move on with his life. Meanwhile, Riggs and Murtaugh are assigned to protect a comical federal witness, Leo Getz, whom they ultimately become close friends with.

He meets Sgt. Lorna Cole, an internal affairs officer, in Lethal Weapon 3 during an investigation into the disappearance of weapons from LAPD impound. The two make an immediate connection and work closely together to clear Murtaugh's name after he is forced to kill his son's friend in self-defense. Riggs and Cole become romantically involved and move in together after the end of the film.

In Lethal Weapon 4, Riggs and Cole are still living together, and she is pregnant with their child, but they have dodged the issue of marriage. Both Riggs and Murtaugh are promoted to captain by the fourth film in order to keep them out of trouble, but are demoted back to sergeants at the end of the film. Leo helps Riggs finally make peace with his wife's death; Riggs marries Cole while she is giving birth to their son.

Television series 

In a March 2016 newspaper article, the plot for the television pilot is as follows: "When Texas cop and former Navy SEAL Martin Riggs...suffers the loss of his wife and baby, he moves to Los Angeles to start anew. There, he gets partnered with LAPD detective Roger Murtaugh...who, having recently suffered a "minor" heart attack, must avoid any stress in his life. In the Season Two finale, Riggs kills his abusive father during a fight after rescuing Murtaugh's wife. At the end of the episode, Riggs visits his deceased wife's grave. At the gravesite, his much younger half-brother Garrett shows up, shoots him in the chest, mortally wounding him, and leaves. In the Season Three premiere, he dies from his gunshot wound in the hospital and is subsequently replaced by Wesley Cole as Murtaugh's partner.

Weapons

Films 
 Lethal Weapon (1987) – Beretta 92F
 Lethal Weapon 2 (1989) – Beretta 92FS
 Lethal Weapon 3 (1992) – Beretta 92FS
 Lethal Weapon 4 (1998) – Beretta 92FS

Television 
 Season 1 – Beretta 92FS
 Season 2 – Heckler & Koch VP9

Riggs is also a practitioner of several styles of martial arts that include Wing Chun, Judo, Taekwondo, Boxing, Capoeira, Shotokan Karate and Brazilian Jiu-Jitsu.

Reception 

Critics have given the character a positive reception. He is praised for his dramatic and brutal fight scene with Mr. Joshua (Gary Busey) and the sharp and clever dialogue provided by Shane Black. Martin Riggs is number 100 on Empire's list of The 100 Greatest Movie Characters.

References 

Lethal Weapon (franchise)
Film characters introduced in 1987
Action film characters
Fictional Wing Chun practitioners
Fictional taekwondo practitioners
Fictional judoka
Fictional Brazilian jiu-jitsu practitioners
Fictional shotokan practitioners
Fictional capoeira practitioners
Fictional American police detectives
Fictional Los Angeles Police Department detectives
Fictional characters from Los Angeles
Fictional assassins
Fictional Vietnam War veterans
Fictional Central Intelligence Agency personnel
Fictional United States Army Special Forces personnel
Fictional marksmen and snipers
Fictional police sergeants
Fictional police captains
Fictional police officers in films
Action television characters
Fictional attempted suicides